Jean Alexandre may refer to:
Jean Alexandre (footballer) (born 1986), Haitian footballer
Jean C. Alexandre (born 1942), Haitian diplomat
Jean Alexandre (cyclist) (born 1917), Belgian Olympic cyclist